Siah Ettefaq-e Pain (also Romanized as Sīāh Ettefāq-e Pā’īn; also known as Sīāh Tefāq) is a village in Birk Rural District, in the Central District of Mehrestan County, Sistan and Baluchestan Province, Iran. At the 2006 census, its population was 333, in 73 families.

References 

Populated places in Mehrestan County